Combretum fruticosum, known as orange flame vine or chameleon vine,  is a species of bushwillow that occurs from Mexico to northern Argentina.

Description 
The branches are cylindrical and striated.

The leaves are persistent to semipersistent, dense and dry. They are simple, opposite, sometimes alternate, 6 to 16 cm long and 3 to 8 cm broad, with an entire margin and a short petiole.

The flowers appear in summer and are yellowish to reddish, small, grouped in axillar spikes 8 to 16 cm long. The calyx is bell-shaped with 4 lobules 5 mm long, the corolla has 4 very small petals 1 to 1.5 mm long. The 8 stamens are 3 cm long and have reddish anthers. The number of flowers varies from 52 to 93 in each inflorescence.

The fruit forms in autumn and is dry and indehiscent, 2 cm long, and reddish brown.

References 

fruticosum
Medicinal plants
Vines